Hormidium is a group of orchids whose various species have been transferred to Encyclia, Epidendrum, Homalopetalum, Lepanthes, and Prosthechea.

Hormidium can also refer to:

 A genus of algae, an illegitimate name whose application caused confusion, now included in the Prasiolaceae
 Klebsormidium, a genus of filamentous charophyte green algae
 Epidendrum subg. Hormidium, a subgenus of Epidendrum

See also
 Homidium or Ethidium bromide
 Horminum, a genus of flowering plants in the family Lamiaceae